The large moth family Crambidae contains the following genera beginning with "S":

References 

 S
Crambid